Wood End (or Kempston Wood End) is a small village located in the Borough of Bedford in Bedfordshire, England.

The settlement was historically one of the hamlets (or "Ends") of Kempston. Today, Wood End forms part of Kempston Rural, and is the southernmost settlement within the parish. Wood End is also close to Keeley Green, and Wootton.

Villages in Bedfordshire
Borough of Bedford